The railway system in Ghana has historically been confined to the plains south of the barrier range of mountains north of the city of Kumasi. However, the  narrow gauge railway, totalling 1,300 kilometres, is undergoing major rehabilitation and inroads to the interior are now being made. In Ghana, most of the lines are single tracked, and in 1997 it was estimated that 32 kilometres were double tracked.

There are no rail links of the main system with adjoining countries. However, the Lomé—Aflao line of the Togo rail system is partly located in Ghana. There are also plans to extend the Kumasi-Takoradi railway to Paga, by the Burkina Faso border, plus a branch from Tamale to Yendi.

Time line 
Inverse order.

2020 
Several SGR are under construction, including
 a line from Tema, via Ho and Tamale to Ouagadougou, the capital of Burkina Faso
 a concrete sleeper plant at Hemi.

See also 
 Railway stations in Ghana

References

External links 
 unofficial website of Ghana Railways
 , illustrated description of the railways of Ghana

Further reading 
 Fred Shelford, "On West African Railways", Journal of the Royal African Society, 1 (April, 1902), pp. 339–354

 
3 ft 6 in gauge railways in Ghana